I Am an American may refer to:  

 "I Am an American", a 1916 poem by Elias Lieberman
 I Am an American (film), a 2001 public service announcement